Noè Cruciani (26 January 1963 – 20 May 1996) was an Italian boxer. He competed in the men's middleweight event at the 1984 Summer Olympics.

References

External links
 

1963 births
1996 deaths
Italian male boxers
Olympic boxers of Italy
Boxers at the 1984 Summer Olympics
Middleweight boxers
People from Foligno
Sportspeople from the Province of Perugia
20th-century Italian people